The Anglican Church of St John in Skilgate, Somerset, England was built in the 14th century. It is a Grade II* listed building.

History

The church was built in the 14th century and the tower remains, however the rest of the structure was rebuilt as a Victorian restoration in 1872. Further restorations were undertaken in 1933 and 1972.

The parish is part of the Dulverton with Brushford, Brompton Regis, Upton, Withiel Florey and Skilgate benefice within the Diocese of Bath and Wells.

Architecture

The stone building has Hamstone dressings and a slate roof. It consists of a two-bay nave with a north aisle, chancel, vestry and south porch. The two-stage tower has stepped buttresses.

Within the church is a plaque commemorating those who died in World War I. A new organ was installed in the 21st century.

In the churchyard is the remains of a cross.

See also
 List of ecclesiastical parishes in the Diocese of Bath and Wells

References

Grade II* listed buildings in West Somerset
Grade II* listed churches in Somerset